Ginalina, is a Canadian folk music singer-songwriter, children's musician, and children's author.  

Her music has received three Juno Awards nominations, four Canadian Folk Music Awards nominations, and two Western Canadian Music Awards.  She sings in several languages (English, French, Mandarin)  and her children's song, Small But Mighty was featured as part of the CBC Music in the Classroom Challenge among 25 Canadian musicians.  She was featured in festivals including international children's festivals, Folk on the Rocks, Festival du Bois, Bella Coola Music Festival, and Mariposa Folk Festival. 

Ginalina's music videos have been aired on Universal Kids Get Up and Move, Kidoodle.TV in the Canada and United States as well as on the Knowledge Network.

Books by Ginalina feature the Canadian Geographic recommended, and Kirkus Reviews recommended title, The Mighty River (2020, Peppermint Toast Publishing), the award-winning sequel, The Lively Forest (2021, Peppermint Toast Publishing),  and final book in the nature trilogy, The Blooming Mountain (2022, Peppermint Toast Publishing).

Discography
 Going Back: Remembered and Remixed Family Folk Songs, Vol. 1 (2022)
 Small but Mighty (2019)
 It Takes a Village (2018)
 Home is Family (2016)
 Forest Friends' Nature Club (2015)
 Sandcastle Magic (2012)

References

Canadian children's musicians
Canadian folk singer-songwriters
Musicians from Vancouver
Living people
Year of birth missing (living people)